Muscocyclops bidenatus is a species of copepod in the family Cyclopidae. It is endemic to Brazil.  Its natural habitat is swamps.

References

Cyclopoida
Fauna of Brazil
Freshwater crustaceans of South America
Taxonomy articles created by Polbot
Crustaceans described in 1987